The Toy Castle is a Canadian children's television show that aired on Treehouse TV, TVOntario, SCN, Access, Knowledge Network, TFO and TQS. It was aired from September 4, 2000 to December 26, 2003 and produced by Sound Venture Productions. It was inspired by Sound Venture's 1992 Christmas ballet special The Tin Soldier, which starred Frank Augustyn and was based on Hans Christian Andersen's fairy tale. It is now shown during the Christmas season on Treehouse, TFO and Noovo. Told through ballet and narration, the stories are about a group of toys in a toy castle that magically come to life when the children are asleep.  This series won a Gemini Award in 2003 for "Best Preschool Series".

The series also aired on public television stations in the United States, TF1, France 3, M6 and Piwi+ in France and JimJam in Italy.

Plot
The Toy Castle is a show about a group of toys that magically come to life when their children are asleep.  When the children are about to wake up, the toys dash around fast until they are back in their former positions.  Each episode consists of three story lines, in which the toys all dance around the castle and get into situations which the viewer may relate to.

Characters
 The Soldier (Jorden Morris) enjoys marching and dancing, and loves the lovely Ballerina. Judging by his accent, he is of British nationality (French nationality in the French-language version).
 The Ballerina (Elizabeth Olds) enjoys dancing and loves the soldier. Judging by her accent, she is of French nationality (British nationality in the French-language version). She is best friends with China Doll and Rag Doll.
 The China Doll (Jennifer Welsman) enjoys dancing and tea. She is shy and prefers quiet activities. She is best friends with Ballerina and Rag Doll.
 The Clown (Keir Knight) is a loud and wild toy. He likes joking around and playing. His best friends are Goblin and Rag Doll.
 The Goblin (Yosuke Mino) enjoys playing pranks on people and teasing. His best friends are Rag Doll and Clown.
 The Rag Doll (Sayaka Karasugi) enjoys twirling and playing. She dreams of being a pretty lady like Ballerina and China Doll. Her best friends are Goblin, Clown, Ballerina and China Doll.
 The Sailor (Raven S. Wilder) likes to tell tales and sail the seven seas. His favorite dance is the jig.
 The Strong Man (David Lucas) likes lifting weights and his stuffed cat, Meow Meow. He may be in love with China Doll, as they dated in one episode, but that was the only time it was shown.
 Freida (Andrea Mislan) enjoys dancing the frog-a-doddle-five and playing with her twin brother, Fredrick. She speaks with a Southern accent (Meridional accent in the French version).
 Fredrick (Sofia Costantini) enjoys dancing the frog-a-doddle-five and playing with his twin sister, Freida. He speaks with a Southern accent (Meridional accent in the French version).
 Mama Mouse (Daiva Preston, Andrea Mistan) is shy. She is married to Papa Mouse, and has three children.
 Papa Mouse (Micheal Flynn) is a caring man. He and his wife have three children.
 Little Mouse (Corinne Vessey) likes playing and imagining he is riding a horse. He was named Baby Mouse in the first season, but with two new siblings coming, they quietly changed his name to Little Mouse.
 The Mouse Twins - They are twins who both cry often. They enjoy quiet things and swinging. They have never been given official names, being referred to simply as 'The Mouse Twins'.
 The Dolly Bird wears extravagant make-up and loves dancing for people. She tends to be insecure about her dancing. She has appeared in the fewest episodes and is never mentioned on the official site.
 The Little Boy (Billy Jeans) sleeps in his bed while the toys are dancing and in motion, but when he turns his head around sleeping, the toys return to their former poses as regular figures. He is only shown in the series' opening, in the ending part of an episode, and in the credits background.
 The Little Girl (Ivy Bregman) sleeps in her bed while the toys are dancing and in motion, but when she turns her head around sleeping, the toys return to their former poses as regular figures. She is only shown in the series' opening, in the ending part of an episode, and in the credits background.

Episodes

Pilot (1992)

Season 1 (2000)

References

External links

The Toy Castle website archived by the Wayback Machine

PBS Kids shows
TF1 original programming
M6 (TV channel) original programming
France Télévisions children's television series
Canal+ original programming
Canadian children's fantasy television series
Treehouse TV original programming
TVO original programming
TFO original programming
Noovo original programming
Sentient toys in fiction
2000 Canadian television series debuts
2003 Canadian television series endings
2000s Canadian children's television series
Fiction about toys
Canadian supernatural television series
English-language television shows
French-language television shows
Christmas television series
Television shows based on works by Hans Christian Andersen
Television shows filmed in Winnipeg
Canadian television shows featuring puppetry
Television about magic
Works based on The Steadfast Tin Soldier
Canadian preschool education television series
2000s preschool education television series